Himeroconcha quadrasi is a species of gastropod in the Charopidae family. It is endemic to Guam.

References

Fauna of Guam
Himeroconcha
Gastropods described in 1894
Taxonomy articles created by Polbot